Donkey Kong Barrel Blast is a 2007 racing game for Nintendo's Wii video game console. The game was shown at the E3 convention in May 2006 for the GameCube under the title of DK: Bongo Blast, but this version was ultimately cancelled in favor of a Wii release. It was released for the Wii in Japan and the United States in 2007, and in PAL regions in 2008 with the title Donkey Kong Jet Race.

The game was originally developed to be controlled using the DK Bongos for the GameCube. Barrel Blast was faced with generally negative reviews after its release, with critics criticizing the replaced bongo control scheme with that using the Wii Remote and Nunchuk, as well as the last-generation visuals.

Gameplay

Donkey Kong Barrel Blast is a racing game where the player can handle the selected character using the Wii Remote and Nunchuk, replacing the DK Bongos that initially were to be used. To accelerate, the player must shake the Wii Remote and Nunchuk alternatively, lift them simultaneously to jump and use the motion sensor to beat rivals and obstacles using items, while the character will be guided by the route of the tracks, including automatically travelling around curves. Players can learn to race at Cranky's flight school where Cranky gives eight lessons on how to play the game, acceleration, use of elements and Wild Moves.

The main mode of play is a Grand Prix similar to that of Mario Kart. Also, like Mario Kart Arcade GP, more than one track will take place in a given area with three courses in DK Jungle, three of the sea, three from the mountain, two of the Desert, two from the snow, two of the Temple of Heaven, and one in outer space. Like other racing games, Barrel Blast includes a Time Trial Mode where players can choose this race on one track for the best time, and have save ghost data stats.

There are 16 characters to choose from in total; eight members of the Kong family, and eight Kremlings. These include Donkey Kong, Diddy Kong, Dixie Kong, Lanky Kong, Tiny Kong, Funky Kong, Wrinkly Kong, and Cranky Kong representing the Kong side, with Kritter, Kip, Kass, Klump, Kalypso, Kludge, Kopter, and King K. Rool representing the Kremling side. Additional Donkey Kong series characters, such as Rambi the Rhino, Enguarde the Swordfish, Zinger, and Necky, make cameo appearances as items.

Development

Barrel Blast was developed by Paon who previously worked on DK: King of Swing and DK: Jungle Climber for Nintendo.

In June 2005, an issue of Famitsu reported that Nintendo was in development with a Wii-bound sequel to the Donkey Kong franchise. The publication offered no details on the next-generation title. Nintendo appeared to be drawing on the majority of its big licenses to lure in next-generation gamers. Lending credibility to its Kong news, Famitsu also reported that new versions of Super Smash Bros., Super Mario, The Legend of Zelda, Metroid, and Final Fantasy Crystal Chronicles were in development for Revolution, all of which were confirmed by Nintendo at E3 2005 before that month. The game was announced at Nintendo's Japanese conference in 2006. The game was later shown to the public at E3 2007 as named Donkey Jet and DK: Bongo Blast.

The game was originally developed to be controlled using the DK Bongos for the GameCube; the left and right drums would steer in their respective directions, and rolling both drums accelerated movement. When the game was moved to the Wii, the DK Bongos were replaced with the Wii Remote and Nunchuk, having the player shake the controller in place of hitting the drums. The player can also raise the remote and Nunchuk to jump, and use the motion sensing to punch opponents and obstacles, and to use items.

Reception

Donkey Kong Barrel Blast received negative reviews. GameSpot and IGN gave it 4.5 out of 10 each, and GamePro was the harshest by calling it "the worst game of 2007". Based on 34 reviews, Barrel Blast garnered a metascore of 46 out of 100 according to Metacritic. A number of reviews lamented the decision to replace the bongo control scheme with that using the Wii Remote and nunchuk, as well as the dated visuals.

It was criticized for "slow racing, shallow gameplay, and an overall boring experience" by IGN. GameSpot labeled the game a fifth-rate Mario Kart clone. The second-highest rated Metacritic review, by Nintendo Power, called it a "mundane racer". GameTrailers criticized the game for its imprecise controls, lack of online mode, and the fact that the Bongo Controls were left out of the game.

See also
 Diddy Kong Racing
 Diddy Kong Racing DS

Notes

References

External links
Official website
Donkey Kong: Barrel Blast at Nintendo
 

2007 video games
Cancelled GameCube games
Donkey Kong video games
Racing video games
Wii games
Wii-only games
Video games developed in Japan